Lucien Laurent Bonheur (25 June 1864 - ?), was a prominent Progressive. He was President of the French Drama Society.

Biography
He was born on 25 Jun 1864 in Paris, France.

Archive
His papers are archived at Ohio State University.

References

1864 births
Year of death missing
19th-century French people